Cyrtodactylus chamba,  also known as the Chamba bent-toed gecko, is a species of gecko endemic to India.

References

Cyrtodactylus
Reptiles described in 2018
Endemic fauna of India
Reptiles of India